Asura furcata is a moth of the family Erebidae. It is found in India.

References

furcata
Moths described in 1936
Moths of Asia